Buford "Geechie" Meredith (October 22, 1899 – January 13, 1932) was an American baseball infielder in the Negro leagues. He played from 1920 to 1931, playing mostly with the Birmingham Black Barons. He also played with the Memphis Red Sox and the Nashville Elite Giants. Meredith died in an off-season mining accident.

References

External links
 and Baseball-Reference Black Baseball stats and Seamheads

1899 births
1932 deaths
Birmingham Black Barons players
Memphis Red Sox players
Baseball players from Alabama
People from Jefferson County, Alabama
Industrial accident deaths
Accidental deaths in Alabama
20th-century African-American sportspeople
Baseball infielders